The 1959 Minnesota Golden Gophers football team represented the University of Minnesota in the 1959 Big Ten Conference football season. In their sixth year under head coach Murray Warmath, the Golden Gophers compiled a 2–7 record and were outscored by their opponents by a combined total of 159 to 98.
 
End Tom Moe received the team's Most Valuable Player award. Tackle Michael W. Wright was named an Academic All-American and Academic All-Big Ten. Offensive lineman Jerome Shetler was also named Academic All-Big Ten.

Total attendance at five home games was 263,983, an average of 52,796 per game. The largest crowd was against Michigan.

Schedule

References

Minnesota
Minnesota Golden Gophers football seasons
Minnesota Golden Gophers football